A80 or A-80 may refer to:

 A80 road (Scotland), a major road in Scotland
 Autovía A-80, a road connecting Ribadesella and Cangas de Onis, Spain
 HLA-A80, an HLA-A serotype

and also :
 Dutch Defence, in the Encyclopaedia of Chess Openings
 A fourth generation Toyota Supra (ID code: A80)
 AAT (disambiguation)
 Samsung Galaxy A80, phone manufactured by Samsung Electronics